Edward William Cole (born Edward William Kisleauskas, March 22, 1909 – July 28, 1999) was a Major League Baseball pitcher who played for the St. Louis Browns in  and .

External links
Baseball Reference.com

1909 births
1999 deaths
St. Louis Browns players
Major League Baseball pitchers
Baseball players from Pennsylvania
Sportspeople from Wilkes-Barre, Pennsylvania